Bertalan Kun (born 6 May 1999) is a Hungarian professional footballer who plays as a midfielder for FK Proleter Novi Sad.

Playing career

Early career
Bertalan Kun started to play in Veszprém FC USE in 2005 when he was six. His first coach was Miklós Kelemen. From the U6 team he reached the higher levels. In the 2010–2011 season, when Csaba Kozma was his coach, he scored 11 goals in 20 games in the U13 team of North-West group of NBII. One year later he scored 58 goals in 16 games and he became the top scorer of his level.

PSV
His father got a two-year job contract in the Netherlands and his son moved with him to Eindhoven. There he joined the PSV D1 team which was trained in the De Herdgang training complex. In 2011 PSV Eindhoven launched an application for the international transfer of underage players but the FIFA rejected it at the first time. After this, they sent this petition twice but none of them were successful. However, on 25 August 2015 they received the permission when the European Union authorizes the transfers of the players over the age of 16 within the EU. Between 2011 and 2015 Bertalan Kun could play in PSV Eindhoven because his club sent him to many international tournaments and friendly games.

He debuted among the adults on 6 November 2016 when he got an opportunity in Jong PSV which is the reserve team of PSV Eindhoven in the Dutch second division. He was replaced in the 65 minutes in a league game against FC Volendam but they lose 0–1. In December there were rumours in the press about several Premier League and Portuguese first division club want to sign him. The news was confirmed by his manager.

Győri ETO
After leaving Jong PSV in the summer 2019, Kun returned to Hungary and signed a deal until the summer 2021 with Győri ETO FC on 8 October 2019.

Next he played one season with Zalaegerszeg.

Proleter
In September 2021 he signed ŵith Serbian side FK Proleter Novi Sad.

International career

U15: He got his first invitation to the Hungarian national U15 team in November 2013 from György Korolovszky. His debut was against Slovakia (0-0) on 5 November 2013. He scored at the first time in a Hungary – Turkey (3-3) game on 10 April 2014.

U16: He got his invitation to the Hungarian national U16 team in August 2014 from István Mihalecz. He played ten times here and he scored in the 4th minute of a Hungary – Latvia game (4-0) on 10 March 2015.

U17: He became a player of the Hungarian national U17 team in September 2015 which was managed by Zoltán Szélesi. He could play in this national team only twice. He was not entered to the European U17 Championship in 2016.

U18: In August 2016 Antal Németh called him in to the Hungarian national U18 team. He made his debut against Russia in this age group on 16 August 2016.

U19: In October 2016 the manager of the U19 team, Michael Boris called him in to the Hungarian national team. He debuted against Greece on 13 October and he played out the whole game.

Career statistics

References

External links
 Official website
 Bertalan Kun PSV.nl
 Jeugdspeler Bertalan Kun tekent contract

1999 births
Living people
Hungarian footballers
Hungarian expatriate footballers
Hungary youth international footballers
Association football midfielders
Jong PSV players
Győri ETO FC players
Eerste Divisie players
Nemzeti Bajnokság II players
Expatriate footballers in the Netherlands
Hungarian expatriate sportspeople in the Netherlands
Nemzeti Bajnokság I players
Zalaegerszegi TE players
FK Proleter Novi Sad players
Serbian SuperLiga players
Expatriate footballers in Serbia
People from Veszprém
Sportspeople from Veszprém County